The Wallace Bridge, also known as the Nimrod Bridge, is a historic bridge in rural Perry County, Arkansas. It is located southeast of the hamlet of Nimrod, carrying County Road 18 (Wallace Bridge Road) across the Fourche La Fave River. It is a single-span camelback through truss structure, set on concrete abutments. The bridge was built in 1908, its trusses constructed by the Southwestern Bridge Company. At the time of its listing on the National Register of Historic Places in 2008, it was one of three surviving camelback truss bridges in the state.

See also
Fourche LaFave River Bridge: a historic bridge over the Fourche La Fave River
Ward's Crossing Bridge: a historic bridge over the Fourche La Fave River
List of bridges documented by the Historic American Engineering Record in Arkansas
List of bridges on the National Register of Historic Places in Arkansas
National Register of Historic Places listings in Perry County, Arkansas

References

External links

Historic American Engineering Record in Arkansas
Road bridges on the National Register of Historic Places in Arkansas
Bridges completed in 1908
1908 establishments in Arkansas
Parker truss bridges in the United States
National Register of Historic Places in Perry County, Arkansas
Transportation in Perry County, Arkansas
Fourche La Fave River